Chorizanthe robusta is a species of flowering plant in the buckwheat family. It is endemic to California, where it is a rare, federally listed endangered species.

Description
Chorizanthe robusta is variable in form, growing decumbent or erect and reaching a maximum length of half a meter. It is grayish in color and hairy. The inflorescence is made up of several flowers with each flower surrounded by white or pink bracts with hooked tips. The flower itself is just a few millimeters long and white to pink in color.

Varieties
It is composed of two varieties:
var. robusta, known generally as the robust spineflower, which is known only from southern Santa Cruz and Monterey Counties,
var. hartwegii, the Scotts Valley spineflower, which is known from a few locations in Scotts Valley in Santa Cruz County.

The plant is closely related to Chorizanthe pungens, another rare endemic from the area.

References

External links
Jepson Manual Treatment: Chorizanthe robusta
The Nature Conservancy: C. robusta
Photo gallery: C.robusta var. hartwegii

robusta
Endemic flora of California
Natural history of the California chaparral and woodlands
Natural history of the San Francisco Bay Area
Natural history of Santa Cruz County, California
Plants described in 1889